A children's fiction author, Wren Blackberry emerged with the publication of the Métrico Mesh series. Much of her work attempts to incorporate educational curriculum standards, lightly touching on several scientific and historical subjects. A teacher by profession, Wren Blackberry worked in higher education in the United States from 1985.

The Métrico Mesh Series
The protagonists in this series are American Portuguese pre-teens, residing in a coastal town of southern Massachusetts. While the original text is in English, the characters do not neglect to scatter in Portuguese phrases and customs.

The books appear Judeo-Christian, with solely Christian references only in Anything But Static, which parallels the New Testament conversion of the apostle Paul. The series is directed toward independent middle readers, throwing in challenging words similar to terms students would learn at school.

In the back of each book, the author suggests projects for further study of topics, helping teachers and home schoolers integrate their course content.

Selected works

Under the Grass
Under the Grass  pulls science into the description of dragons in  Job 40–41. Jeff Métrico struggles to understand dragons, and explain what he has found, parallels the social rejection of Job.

Levitical Day
Levitical Day Jacquie Métrico uses information from Leviticus 19 to rescue her friends from fungal disaster.

Deep Echoes to Deep
Deep Echoes to Deep Jeff Métrico returns to the scene of the dragon with a film crew, not suspecting that they would desert him. His cave wanderings parallel David's escape from King Saul, with references to Psalm 42.

Anything But Static
Anything But Static  Emotions charge as a new boy visits Sunday school class and tries to set everyone straight. The book discusses electricity, lightning, and the struggle the early church experienced in accepting the zealous Saul as the converted apostle Paul of Acts 9.

Math Fiction
Math Fiction  Jeff Métrico was not a natural born leader, but found himself in charge of two hundred kids in a blackout. He used mathematical principles of fractals and statistics and principles used in Numbers 10 by Moses to organize people and maintain sanity.

References

External links
Josiah Publishing author biographies

American children's writers
Year of birth missing (living people)
Living people
American women novelists
American educators
21st-century American women